Miguel Carlos Lim Bustos (born December 4, 1988),  better known as Migs Bustos, is a Filipino sports television news anchor, forecaster, commentator and reporter and model working for ABS-CBN, ABS-CBN Sports and Action and ANC.

Early life and education
Bustos was born on December 4, 1988. In 2010, Bustos obtained his bachelor's degree in business management at De La Salle University.

Career
Bustos worked as a commentator at National Collegiate Athletic Association on ABS-CBN Sports and Action and as a field reporter for Bandila and TV Patrol on ABS-CBN before he works as a sports news anchor on Gametime, a 30-minute sports newscast airing weekdays at 7:00 p.m. featuring sports highlights, game recaps, exclusive interviews, and interactive segments on ANC. He is also the host of REV which features cars. He also appeared in different television advertisements.

Bustos is also a licensed real estate broker.

In 2022, he became the segment host of TV Patrol's newest segment, "Uso at Bago." After the passing of sports commentator and news anchor Boyet Sison, Bustos replaced him as the segment host of "Alam N'yo Ba?" on the news program. The same year, he became one of the co-hosts of "Dr. Care" and "Pasok Mga Suki" on PIE Channel with beauty queen Nicole Cordoves and online business personality Madam Inutz.

Personal life
In October 2018, Bustos tied the knot with his college sweetheart and former TV5 reporter Michelle Mediana after nine years of relationship. They had a daughter named Margaux Andrea.

References

Filipino television news anchors
Filipino sports announcers
Living people
1988 births
De La Salle University alumni